Basra was one of the four s purchased by the Ottoman Empire from France in 1907. The ship served in the Ottoman Navy during the Italo-Turkish War, the Balkan Wars and World War I.

Design
Her hull was made of steel. Her crew, which consisted of 7 officers and 60 sailors when she was built in 1907, consisted of 74 Turks and 17 Germans by 1915 during World War I.

The ship was powered by two vertical triple-expansion steam engines, fed by steam from two water-tube boilers built by SA Chantiers et Ateliers de la Gironde. The ship could carry 60 tons of coal.

As built, the ship carried one Canon de 65 mm Modèle 1891 naval gun, six QF 3-pounder Hotchkiss guns and two 450 mm torpedo tubes.

Construction and purchase
At the turn of the 20th century, during a program to strengthen the Ottoman Navy, large quantities of cannons, ammunition and supplies were ordered from Krupp in 1904. In order to maintain diplomatic and financial balance, the Ottoman government decided to place subsequent orders with France. For this purpose, four Sultanhisar-class torpedo boats were ordered from Schneider-Creusot to meet the needs of the navy. As this small order was not sufficient for the French, the 200-ton s and the 420-ton Marmaris were also ordered. During negotiations in 1906, the French convinced the Ottoman government to purchase four more destroyers, which were ordered on 22 January 1906. Based on the French Durandal-class destroyers, Samsun, Yarhisar and Basra were built by Ateliers de la Gironde, while Taşoz was built by Schneider et Cie.

Operational history

Basra was commissioned into the Ottoman Navy on 3 September 1907 in Istanbul. The Ottoman fleet returned to defensive positions on October 12, with little activity until the end of the conflict.

During the First Balkan War, on 7 November 1912, the ironclad , Turgut Reis and Basra fired on Bulgarian troops that occupied Tekirdağ. On 12 December, Basra and Taşoz went on patrol to the waters of the Dardanelles, intending to ambush Greek destroyers, but had to return due to trouble with their boilers. On 14 January 1913, the cruiser  assisted by Basra and Yarhisar patrolled the entrance to the Dardanelles. On January 18, an Ottoman fleet (consisting of Barbaros Hayreddin, Mecidiye, Basra and Yarhisar) took part in a clash with the Greek fleet near Lemnos On 7–11 February 1913, Basra and Taşoz, together with Asar-i Tevfik, took part in the unsuccessful raid at Podima on the Black Sea coast, losing Asar-i Tevfik during the action.

World War I
At the outbreak of World War I, the destroyer was already obsolete and of low combat value. On 21 September 1914, the Basra and Taşoz escorted the battlecruiser  on a patrol cruise in the Black Sea.

In 1915, her depleted engine room reduced her top speed to 17 knots, and the crew size increased to 91 men(17 Germans and 74 Turks). On 8 August 1915, the destroyer, together with the torpedo boat , took part in the rescue of the crew of the Barbaros Hayreddin, sunk in the Dardanelles by the submarine , avoiding a torpedo fired in her direction by it during a rescue operation of survivors. On October 18, near Bandırma, Basra and Yarhisar surprised  on the surface, which, however, managed to escape.

Prior to the Gallipoli Campaign, Basra, together with her sister ships, escorted transports of Ottoman troops organized to reinforce the forces defending the Dardanelles.

On 14–15 September 1916, five destroyers (including the Basra and Samsun) escorted the freighter , which was transporting coal from Zonguldak. However, the ship struck a mine near Karaburun and was beached; its crew was taken off board by Basra and Samsun.

On 23–25 June 1917, the cruiser Midilli made a combat cruise in the Black Sea, laying, among other things, 70 mines at the mouth of the Danube. Returning to the Bosporus, the ship was fired upon by the Russian battleship  and the destroyer Gnevny and in the last phase of the battle it was covered by Basra and the German submarine UC-23.

On 20 January 1918, the destroyers Basra, Samsun,  and  took part in securing the outing of the Yavuz Sultan Selim and Midilli at the Battle of Imbros, among other things, covering the return to the Dardanelles of the mine-damaged Yavuz Sultan Selim. On March 30, the Basra, Samsun and Taşoz escorted the troop transport Patmos, carrying soldiers from Constanta to Odessa. In October, the ship was put back in reserve in Istanbul.

After the end of the war, on 29 October 1923, Basra was formally incorporated into the newly formed Turkish Navy, although her technical condition did not allow her to operate. In 1924–1925, the vessel underwent an overhaul at Deniz Fabrikaları in Istanbul, and after its completion, she entered active service. The ship was decommissioned in 1932, following the purchase of new destroyers from Italy. The destroyer was scrapped as late as 1949 in Gölcük.

Notes

Footnotes

References
 
 
 
 

World War I naval ships of the Ottoman Empire
1907 ships